Liolaemus cranwelli, also known commonly as Cranwell's tree iguana, is a species of lizard in the family Liolaemidae. The species is native to Bolivia.

Etymology
The specific name, cranwelli, is in honor of Argentinian herpetologist Jorge A. Cranwell.

Distribution and habitat
L. cranwelli is endemic to Santa Cruz Department, Bolivia.

Reproduction
The mode of reproduction of L. cranwelli is unknown.

References

Further reading
Dirksen L, De la Riva I (1999). "Los saurios y anfisbénidos de Bolivia (Reptilia, Squamata): lista patrón, localides y bibliografía ". Graellsia 55: 199–215. (in Spanish).
Donoso-Barros R (1973). "Un nuevo saurio de Bolivia (Lacertilia, Iguanidae)". Neotropica 19: 132–134. (Pelusaurus cranwelli, new species). (in Spanish).
Laurent RF (1984). "On Some Iguanid Genera Related to or Previously Confused with Liolaemus Wiegmann". Journal of Herpetology 18 (4): 357–373. (Liolaemus cranwelli, new combination).

cranwelli
Reptiles described in 1973
Reptiles of Bolivia
Taxa named by Roberto Donoso-Barros